Mbizi is a village in Masvingo Province, Zimbabwe. It is the junction of the Gweru-Maputo and lowveld railway lines, operated by National Railways of Zimbabwe.

Populated places in Masvingo Province